Adriaen Honich (1643, Dordrecht – c.1684), was a Dutch Golden Age landscape painter.

Biography
According to Houbraken, who mentioned him three times with different spellings of his name, he was known as "Lossenbruy" in a poem about the Bentvueghels, where he was called Adriaan Honing, landscape painter from Dordrecht. He was mentioned as Adriaan Honich when he signed Abraham Genoels' , and he was mentioned as Adriaan Honig, or Lossenbruier, when he made the acquaintance of Jan van Bunnik in Rome.

According to the RKD he is known for italianate landscapes, but his whereabouts after 1674 (when he signed Genoels' ) are unknown. Some still life drawings are attributed to him. He died before 1694.

References

Adriaen Honich on Artnet

1643 births
1684 deaths
Dutch Golden Age painters
Dutch male painters
Dutch landscape painters
Artists from Dordrecht
Members of the Bentvueghels